MediaHuman Audio Converter is a freeware audio conversion utility developed by MediaHuman Ltd. The program is used to convert across different audio formats, split lossless audio files using CUE and extract audio from video files. The app can be run on Mac
starting from OS X 10.6 and on Windows XP and higher.
This software does not support CD burning and CD ripping.

Features 
MediaHuman Audio Converter is able to accept many popular audio file formats, such as MP3, WMA and WAV. The software is also capable of importing files to iTunes (Music app on macOS Catalina and above). MediaHuman Audio Converter is designed to use multiple CPU cores when converting files in ‘batch mode’. Its user interface supports drag-and-drop functionality.

License
MediaHuman Audio Converter can be downloaded and used free of charge for commercial and non-commercial use.

Development
MediaHuman Audio Converter was originally developed in the programming language C++ with Qt framework using such libraries as FFmpeg, OpenSSL, LAME, and TagLib.
The user interface of MediaHuman Audio Converter is based on Qt Widgets.

See also 
 High-Efficiency Advanced Audio Coding
 Comparison of audio formats
 List of free software for audio
 List of music software

References 

2011 software
Audio format converters
Software that uses Qt
Windows multimedia software